On 24 October 2014, ISIL militants launched two attacks on Egyptian army positions in the Sinai Peninsula, killing at least 33 security personnel. This was one of the deadliest assaults on the Egyptian military in decades.

The first attack in Sheikh Zuweid killed at least 30 soldiers, while the second one (which took place three hours later near Al-Arish) killed three soldiers. The incidents prompted Egypt's president Abdel Fattah el-Sisi to call for a security meeting, during which a three-months state of emergency and curfew were announced. In addition, the Rafah border crossing with Gaza was closed, a buffer zone between Gaza and Egypt will be initiated, a Hamas delegation was refused entry into Egypt, and peace talks between Israel and Gaza were postponed.

Attacks

The first attack took place at a heavily guarded military checkpoint near the town of Sheikh Zuweid. Around 2 p.m., a car bomb exploded, killing 18 soldiers or more. When more officers were deployed to the bomb site, gunmen rushed in, some of them on vehicles, and attacked using rocket-propelled grenades and other heavy weaponry, killing ten soldiers at least.

Three more soldiers were killed in the second attack when militants opened fire at them, which occurred at a checkpoint in the city of Al-Arish.

Responsibility
On 14 November 2014, the Islamic State of Iraq and the Levant linked militant group Wilayat Sinai published a graphic propaganda video claiming responsibility and showing the execution of the attack.

Reactions

Domestic

Egypt's president Abdel Fattah el-Sisi declared three days of national mourning during an emergency meeting with the National Defense Council. The council said in a statement that the army and the police will "take all necessary measures to tackle the dangers of terrorism and its financing" to preserve the security of the region. The government announced that the northern and central Sinai regions would be under a three-months state of emergency, which includes a daily curfew starting from 5 PM to 7 AM. The following day, Sisi claimed that "foreign hands" were behind the attacks and that they were meant to "break the back of Egypt" as well as the Egyptian military, which he described as the state's pillar. He further added that Egypt is engaged in an "existential battle" against terrorism, but he also predicted that the country would prevail in the end.

Communications have been shut down, which coincided with a large military operation east of Al-Arish announced by the Ministry of Defense, that was underway in the region to locate and target militant hideouts. The operation reportedly involved Apache helicopters and special forces. The helicopters bombed locations south of Rafah and Sheikh Zuweid, near the Gaza Strip.

Presenters on state television wore black and channels carried black ribbons on screen, while Egypt's Grand Mufti Shawki Allam condemned the attacks, adding that the perpetrators "deserve God's wrath on Earth and at the end of days".

A senior Egyptian diplomat said that the talks between Israel and Hamas following the recent war would be postponed, citing "the state of emergency in the border area between Egypt and Gaza". Khalil al-Haya, a Hamas official, said that the Palestinian negotiating team was informed that the talks could not resume in Cairo due to the security situation. The Egyptian government also announced that the Rafah border crossing between Egypt and the Gaza Strip was closed indefinitely in response to the attacks.

Egypt's outlawed Muslim Brotherhood has condemned attacks and held President Abdel Fattah al-Sisi responsible.

International
 – The European Union denounced the deadly attack against Egyptian security personnel in Sinai. "We regret the loss of life and express our deepest condolences to the families of the victims. The EU condemns terrorism in all its forms," said Michael Mann, spokesman for EU High Representative Catherine Ashton, in a brief statement, released late on Friday.

 – Turkey condemned the deadly bombing that targeted Egyptian military forces in the Sinai Peninsula. "We offer our condolences to the victims families and wish for a fast recovery for the injured," Turkey's Foreign Ministry said in a statement on Saturday.

 – Singapore strongly condemned the attacks against Egyptian security personnel, and it sent its deepest condolences to the families of the victims and the people of Egypt.

See also
 Islamist unrest in Egypt (2013–2014)

References

Terrorist incidents in Egypt in 2014
Terrorist incidents in the Sinai Peninsula
Attacks in Egypt in 2014
Massacres in Egypt
Massacres in 2014
Islamic terrorist incidents in 2014
North Sinai Governorate
ISIL terrorist incidents in Egypt
October 2014 events in Asia
Sinai insurgency
Mass murder in 2014
2014 murders in Egypt